Magdy Abdel Ghaffar is the former Interior Minister of Egypt who was in office from March 6, 2015 until June 14, 2018.

References 

Interior Ministers of Egypt
1952 births
Living people